Samantha Spiro (born 20 June 1968) is an English actress and singer. She is best known for portraying Barbara Windsor in the stage play Cleo, Camping, Emmanuelle and Dick and the television films Cor, Blimey! and Babs, DI Vivien Friend in M.I.T.: Murder Investigation Team, Melessa Tarly in the HBO series Game of Thrones and Maureen Groff in Sex Education. She has won two Laurence Olivier Awards.

Background
Born in Whitechapel, London, England, Spiro grew up in Radlett, Hertfordshire. She is Jewish. Spiro decided to be an actress at the age of ten after seeing a production of Androcles and the Lion at the Open Air Theatre, Regent's Park. She joined the National Youth Theatre and later trained at the Webber Douglas Academy of Dramatic Art.

Spiro attended  Bancroft's School from 1982 to 1985 and subsequently returned in 2016 for an Arts & Drama masterclass  Spiro spoke about how her time at Bancroft's had fuelled her enthusiasm for a career in the Arts.

Spiro married actor Mark Leadbetter, whom she met at drama school, in February 2002. They have two daughters and live in Queen's Park, London.

Career

Theatre
Spiro's first acting job after graduating from drama school was with the Open Air Theatre, Regent's Park, in productions of A Midsummer Night's Dream, The Boys From Syracuse and Macbeth. Her many theatre credits include As You Like It, Teechers, The Tragic Roundabout, Jumpers, On the Piste, Roots, How the Other Half Loves and Glyn and It, opposite Penelope Keith.

Spiro played Barbara Windsor in Cleo, Camping, Emmanuelle and Dick at the National Theatre, a production she credits as her first big break, which "open[ed] a lot of doors". She has also appeared in the Minerva Theatre production of Funny Girl and the first West End revival of Alan Ayckbourn's Bedroom Farce.

Spiro played Rachel in Mike Leigh's production of Two Thousand Years at the National Theatre. This was the first Jewish role of her career. She said:

For English/Jewish artists in this business, we’re English first and the Jewish thing comes down the line. Whereas in the United States, Jewishness is a much celebrated thing. Jewishness is a part of their very being.

Here, I think, we repress it and, far from celebrating it, almost shy away from it. After Two Thousand Years, I suddenly felt that there is a place for people like me. Until that point I hadn’t had a career playing Jewish people. I had got that stuff out of the way by the time I came to play Fanny Brice [in Funny Girl] who is very much a Jewish character.

In 2009, Spiro played Maria in the Donmar Warehouse production of Twelfth Night at the Wyndham's Theatre, alongside Derek Jacobi, and Beatrice in Much Ado About Nothing at the Open Air Theatre. Most recently, she appeared in the acclaimed Open Air Theatre production of Hello, Dolly!, playing Dolly Levi.

In 2013, Spiro played Lady Macbeth in Macbeth at Shakespeare's Globe, alongside Billy Boyd and Joseph Millson.

Discussing whether she prefers acting in the theatre to television or film, Spiro said: "I think theatre prefers me. These days you have to do both, but it never feels as if the TV casting people are beating down my door to offer me work. I just feel that in this business you are lucky if you’re doing something you enjoy."

Television, film and radio
Spiro reprised the role of Barbara Windsor in the television adaptation of Cleo, Camping, Emmanuelle and Dick, Cor, Blimey!, starring opposite Geoffrey Hutchings.

Her other television credits include The Bill, Cold Feet, Plebs, Coupling, After You've Gone and M.I.T.: Murder Investigation Team, in which she played the lead role of DI Vivien Friend. She described the role of Friend as "quite an unusual departure for me...I've done quite a bit of comedy and I've played characters who are light-hearted and characters who are tarts with hearts. In M.I.T. there is no tart or heart!" In order to research the part, Spiro spent time with a female Detective Inspector with the real-life Murder Investigation Team. From 9 August 2010, Spiro starred in the BBC comedy Grandma's House. She plays the part of Simon Amstell's aunt Liz. In 2012 she also appeared in the SkyArts comedy series Psychobitches, where she played various female icons including Audrey Hepburn, Elizabeth Taylor, Marilyn Monroe and Mary Whitehouse.

In September 2013, Spiro joined the cast of the BBC Three sitcom Bad Education as Professor Celia Green, the new deputy headmaster and adversary to Jack Whitehall's character.

In 2013 Spiro starred in an episode of the Sky Atlantic series Little Crackers, an autobiographical comedy written by Rebecca Front in which Spiro played Front's mother.

In 2016 she joined the HBO series Game of Thrones in Season 6 as Melessa Tarly, the mother of Samwell Tarly. That year she also joined Tracey Ullman's Show in the recurring role of Birgit, the fictitious fridge-magnet-loving personal assistant and confidante to Tracey Ullman's impression of German Chancellor Angela Merkel. She reprised her role in Ullman's Tracey Breaks the News. In 2017 Spiro reprised her role of Barbara Windsor in the BBC1 drama Babs, a biopic based on the life of Windsor. She also appeared in the Doctor Who episode "The Doctor Falls", as Hazran.

Spiro has appeared in the films Beyond Bedlam (1994), as WPC Foster, and Tomorrow La Scala! (2002), as Janey. She also played Martha Tabram in From Hell (2001), opposite Johnny Depp.

Her radio drama credits include The Casebook of Inspector Steine, Gospel According to Mary, Little Cinderellas, Beside the Seaside, 
Show Boat in which she played Magnolia Hawks, Sarah Kahn in Chicken Soup with Barley and the Guy Meredith play Spring Forward, Fall Back for BBC Radio 7.

In 2018 Spiro played the role of Mrs Erlynne in Kathy Burke's production of Oscar Wilde's Lady Windermere's Fan at London's Vaudeville Theatre. This production was recorded and shown in cinemas under the "More2Screen" initiative.

From 2019, Spiro has portrayed the recurring character Maureen Groff in Laurie Nunn's British comedy-drama series Sex Education.

Awards
In 2001, Spiro was awarded the Olivier Award for Best Actress in a Musical for her performance in the 2000 season Donmar Warehouse production of Merrily We Roll Along. She won a Whatsonstage.com award for Best Actress in a Musical for the same production. In 2010, Spiro was once again awarded the Olivier Award for Best Actress in a Musical for her performance in Hello, Dolly! at the Open Air Theatre, Regent's Park.

Spiro won a 2004 Joseph Jefferson Award for Actress in a Supporting Role in a Musical, for the production of A Little Night Music at the Chicago Shakespeare Theater in Chicago, Illinois.

In the 2011 British Comedy Awards she won the Best Female Comedy Breakthrough Artist award for her performance in Grandma's House.

Filmography

Film

Television

Theatre
 Lady Windermere's Fan Vaudeville Theatre, West End (2018)
 The House They Grew Up In Chichester Minerva (2017)
 Guys and Dolls Phoenix Theatre
 The Taming Of The Shrew d: Toby Frow, Shakespeare's Globe
 Filumena d: Michael Attenborough, Almeida Theatre
 Company d: Jonathan Munby, Sheffield Crucible
 Chicken Soup With Barley d: Dominic Cooke, Royal Court Theatre
 Hello Dolly (Dolly) d:Tim Sheader, Regents Park
Best Actress in a Musical – 2010 Olivier Awards
 Much Ado About Nothing (Beatrice) d: Tim Sheader, Regents Park
 Twelfth Night (Maria) d: Michael Grandage, Donmar / Wyndhams
 Funny Girl (Fanny Brice) d: Angus Jackson, Chichester Festival
 The Family Plays (Mother) d: Joe Hill-Gibbons, Royal Court Theatre
 Two Thousand Years d: Mike Leigh, Royal National Theatre
 A Little Night Music (Charlotte) d: Gary Griffin Chicago Shakespeare's Theatre
Winner:  Best Supporting Actress in a Musical, Joseph Jefferson Awards 2004
 A Midsummer Night's Dream (Titania/Hippolyta) d: Michael Grandage Crucible, Sheffield
 Bedroom Farce (Jan) d: Loveday Ingram Michael Codron Plays
 Merrily We Roll Along (Mary Flynn) d: Michael Grandage Donmar Warehouse
Olivier Awards 2001 & Whatsonstage.com Awards 2001 – Best Actress in a Musical
 As You Like It (Celia) d: Michael Grandage Crucible & Lyric
 Jumpers (Dorothy Moore) d: Bill Alexander Birmingham Rep
 Cleo Camping...(Barbara Windsor) d: Terry Johnson Royal National Theatre
 Roots (Beatie Bryant) d: John Retallack Watford Palace/Oxford
 As You Like It (Phoebe) d: Polly Irvin W. Yorkshire/Bristol
 Teechers (Gail Saunders) d: Graham Watts Hull Truck & No 1 Tour
 On The Piste (Bev Ryan) d: Graham Watts Hull Truck
 How The Other Half Lovers (Mary) d: Penelope Keith Theatre Royal, Windsor
 Glyn & ‘It’ (Clara Bow)  d: Richard Cottrell Yvonne Arnaud & tour
 Midsummer Night's Dream (Hermia) d: Delena Kidd London & Middle East
 Tons Of Money (Simpson) d: David Conville Mercury Th, Colchester
 Midsummer Night's Dream (First Fairy) d: Ian Talbot Regents Park Open Air
 As You Like It (Audrey) d: Maria Aitkin Regents Park Open Air
 Lady Be Good (Daisy) d: Ian Talbot Regents Park Open Air
 Macbeth (Witch) d: Bill Baunt Regents Park Open Air
 The Boys From Syracuse'' (Courtesan) d: Judi Dench Regents Park Open Air

References

External links

1968 births
Living people
Alumni of the Webber Douglas Academy of Dramatic Art
English musical theatre actresses
English stage actresses
English television actresses
English film actresses
English radio actresses
Jewish English actresses
Actresses from London
Laurence Olivier Award winners
People from Mill Hill
English Shakespearean actresses
English people of German-Jewish descent
National Youth Theatre members
20th-century English actresses
21st-century English actresses
Actresses from Hertfordshire
People from Radlett
People educated at Bancroft's School